The Newark and Roselle Railway was incorporated on Aug 28, 1889 by the Lehigh Valley Railroad (LVRR) to advance tracks from the terminus of the Roselle and South Plainfield Railway at Roselle, New Jersey to Pennsylvania Avenue in Newark.  It formed part of the route connecting the LVRR's Easton and Amboy Railroad at South Plainfield to the Jersey City terminal.  

Initially, the Roselle and South Plainfield Railroad had connected with the Central Railroad of New Jersey (CNJ) at Roselle, and LVRR trains had proceeded to Jersey City over the CNJ.

In 1891 the LVRR consolidated the railroads along the Jersey City route into the Lehigh Valley Terminal Railway.  Along with the Newark and Roselle, the other consolidated companies were the Roselle and South Plainfield Railway, the Newark and Passaic Railway, the Newark Railway, the Jersey City, Newark, and Western Railway, the Jersey City Terminal Railway, and the Edgewater Railway.

References 
 Annual Report of the State Board of Assessors of the State of New Jersey, State Printers, 1890, p. 62.  Google books
 News about Railroads, New York Times, Aug 27, 1891

Predecessors of the Lehigh Valley Railroad
Defunct New Jersey railroads
Railway companies established in 1889
Railway companies disestablished in 1891
1889 establishments in New Jersey